The Atlanta Area Council is a local council of the Boy Scouts of America. It serves 13 northern Georgia counties: Carroll, Cherokee, Clayton, Cobb, DeKalb, Douglas, Fulton, Gwinnett, Haralson, Newton, Paulding, Pickens, and Rockdale.

Organization

The council is divided into districts:
 Appalachian Trail District
 Button Gwinnett District
 Foothills District
 Hightower Trail District
 Indian Springs District
 Northern Ridge District
 Phoenix District
 Picketts Mill District
 Silver Comet District
 Soapstone Ridge District
 Southwest Atlanta District
 Southern Crescent District
 Yellow River District

History
The council was known as the Atlanta Council from 1915 to 1939, and as the Polaris Council in the 1950s.

Camps
 Bert Adams Scout Reservation
 Robert W. Woodruff Scout Reservation
 Allatoona Aquatics Base

Order of the Arrow
Egwa Tawa Dee Lodge is the Order of the Arrow lodge that serves the Atlanta Area Council. It was chartered in 1938 as Broad-Winged-Hawk #129. Egwa Tawa Dee is translated from "equa tawadi", the Cherokee language for the lodge's totem, the broad-winged hawk whose literal translation is "big hawk"; for ease of pronunciation, it was spelled out as "Egwa Tawa Dee."

The lodge was chartered in 1938 as Broad-Winged-Hawk No. 129 is divided into 16 chapters, as well as collegiate OA chapters at the Georgia Institute of Technology and at Southern Polytechnic State University. Current chapters include Achewon Woapalanne, Echota, Etowah, Kennesaw, Nagatamen, Lowanne Nimat, Osten Nokose, Silepl Ilaonëtu, Tella Qualla Boundary, Thennethlofkee, Wesadicha and Wvhvlv en Hvresse. Past chapters include Awi-uska, Sagahattee, and South Fulton.

See also
 Scouting in Georgia (U.S. state)

References

Local councils of the Boy Scouts of America
Southern Region (Boy Scouts of America)
Youth organizations based in Georgia (U.S. state)
1916 establishments in Georgia (U.S. state)
Boy Scout Councils in Georgia (U.S. state)